Do Ab Training Camp ( – Pādegān-e Amūzesh Do Āb; also known as Padegān-e Do Āb) is a village and military installation in Rastupey Rural District, in the Central District of Savadkuh County, Mazandaran Province, Iran. At the 2006 census, its population was 25, in 8 families.

References 

Populated places in Savadkuh County
Military installations of Iran